Amphisauropus is an amphibian ichnogenus commonly found in assemblages of ichnofossils dating to the Permian to Triassic. It has been found in Europe, Morocco, and North America.

Description
The foot impressions show five digits and clear palm prints, though the fifth digit is not always impressed. The digits are short and broad with rounded tips. The pes (rear foot) is longer than wide while the manus (front foot) is wider than long. A continuous tail impression is also present.

References

Vertebrate trace fossils